The 2013 ITF Men's Circuit is the 2013 edition of the entry level tour for men's professional tennis, and is the third tier tennis tour below the Association of Tennis Professionals, World Tour and Challenger Tour. It is organised by the International Tennis Federation (ITF) who additionally organizes the ITF Women's Circuit which is an entry level tour for women's professional tennis. Future tournaments are organized to offer either $10,000 or $15,000 in prize money and tournaments which offering hospitality to players competing in the main draw give additional ranking points which are valid under the ATP ranking system, and are to be organized by a national association or approved by the ITF Men's Circuit Committee.

Point distribution

Key

Month

July

August

September

References

External links
 International Tennis Federation official website
 ITF Futures tournaments
 ITF Futures results archive

 07-09